Styloptygma aciculina is a species of sea snail, a marine gastropod mollusk in the family Pyramidellidae, the pyrams and their allies.

Description
The length of the shell attains 7 mm.

Distribution
This marine species occurs off New Caledonia

References

 Souverbie, M. & Montrouzier, X., 1865. Description d'espèces nouvelles de l'Archipel calédonien. Journal de Conchyliologie 13: 150-159
 Peñas A. & Rolán E. (2016). Deep water Pyramidelloidea from the central and South Pacific. 3. The tribes Eulimellini and Syrnolini. Universidade de Santiago de Compostela. 304 pp. page(s): 280, figs 14E, 74D-H

External links
 To World Register of Marine Species

Pyramidellidae
Gastropods described in 1865